Matador, a.s. (a joint-stock company) is a multinational car tire producer based in Púchov, Slovakia, as well as the corresponding group of companies.

It exports above 87% of its production into 80 countries worldwide. It does not produce only tires, but also associated and similar products and services. It has several trading companies and a network of shops. The largest export customers are the United States, United Kingdom, Germany, and the CIS states.

Matador now also produces conveyor belts, automotive parts and machinery.

History

The company arose in the town of Púchov in 1947 as a "national enterprise" that was split off from the old firm Matador Bratislava.

Matador Bratislava was founded in 1905 (till 1911 known as the "Matador - Gummi und Balata Werke") involved mainly in the production of rubber hoses and belts in its new facilities in Petržalka, a district of Bratislava. Since 1925, it has produced tires (the first tires producer in former Czechoslovakia). Its tires were fitted to many Czechoslovak automobiles of the 1930s, thus contributing in co-operation with the brands Škoda, Tatra, Aero and others to the development of automotive industry in Central Europe. The firm was nationalized in 1946 and privatized in 1995. Its trade name has been Matadorex, a.s. since the privatization. The key role in privatization and transformation of the company was played by Štefan Rosina, who initially joined the firm in 1950 as a regular worker and eventually became the leader of the management team.

Matador in Púchov itself was established as a "national enterprise" (since 1988 "state-owned enterprise") for tire production in 1947. Production started in 1950. It was called "Gumárne 1. mája" (which translates to "rubber works of 1st of May"), at that time and sold its products under the trademark Barum. Gradually it expanded its production and became the monopoly producer of air tubes (since 1962) and the main producer of rubber conveyor belts (since 1955) in Czechoslovakia. It also started to produce truck radial tires in the 1970s. The company founded its own R&D center in 1987 (now "Vipo") and provided technical assistance for the construction of rubber works in India, Indonesia, Ethiopia, Cambodia, Burma, Syria, Turkey, Iran and Yugoslavia. In 1991 it was turned into a joint-stock company and privatization took place 1992-1994. The trademark of the products of the company was changed to Matador and the firm's name was changed to Gumárne Barum in 1991 and to Matador in 1993.

The joint venture "Continental Matador" for the production of truck tires was established in Púchov in September 1998.
In 1999 the transformation of the company took its final phase by change of management and by shift to division management system.
The management of the Company is being transformed to the German model.

 In 2001, Matador was one of the first companies in middle Europe to fulfil technical specification ISO/TS 16949. This is a system of quality management in the automotive industry accepted by important automotive associations.
 In December 2001 the company Det Norske Veritas issued the Management Quality System Certificate in accordance with standards ISO 9001:2000, valid for design, production, assembling, servicing and sales of machines and equipment for rubber industry and management of design and development, production, servicing and sales of moulds.
 In September 2005 Matador celebrated its one hundredth  anniversary and  introduced a new company logo to represent the company.
 In 2007 the company Continental AG acquired 51% of the Matador Rubber Division.
 On 1 July 2008, Continental and Matador Group agreed on the transfer of an additional 15% of the shares in Continental Matador Rubber, at which date the Continental Group owned 66% of the shares in Continental Matador Rubber.
 In 2009 Continental AG Hannover increased their capital share to 100%. New Continental’s distribution-logistic centre was open in that year in Puchov, for Central and Eastern Europe, as well as the new production finalisation hall.
 In May 2010 Continental opened a new production hall in Púchov that enabled an increase of capacities for the production of passenger and light truck tires.

Major subsidiaries
in Slovakia:
 Vipo – applied research
Obnova Brno, a.s., Czech Republic
Matador Deutschland GmbH, Düsseldorf, Germany
Matador (UK) Ltd., United Kingdom
Matador-Omskshina, Russia (a joint-venture)
ZAO Matador-A, Kazakhstan

Tire range 
Matador produces tires for passenger cars and trucks. Matador’s 2021 international product range includes:

 MP47 Hectorra 3 – summer tire for passenger vehicles and SUVs
 MPS330 Maxilla 2 – summer tire for transporters and vans
 MPS300 Maxilla AP (AP means All Purpose) – summer tire for transporters and vans, newer and more durable than MPS330 Maxilla 2
 MP92 Sibir Snow – winter tire for middle-class and luxury vehicles and SUVs
 MP54 Sibir Snow – winter tire for compact-class vehicles
 MP30 Sibir Ice 2 – studded tire for passenger vehicles and SUVs, recommended for Scandinavian winters
 MPS530 Sibir Snow Van – winter tire for transporters and vans
 MPS500 Sibir Ice Van – studded tire for transporters and vans, recommended for Scandinavian winters
 MP61 Adhessa Evo – all season tire for compact-class vehicles
 MP62 All Weather Evo – all season tire for middle-class vehicles
 MP82 Conquerra 2 – all season tire for SUVs and pickups, optimized for on-road and light off-road conditions
 MP72 Izzarda A/T 2 – all season tire for SUVs and pickups, optimized for damage resistance in hard off-road conditions
 MPS400 Variant All Weather 2 – all season tire for transporters and vans, presented in 2017 as Matador’s first a/s tire with both of M+S (Mud + Snow) and 3PMSF (Three-Peak Mountain Snow Flake) symbol

References

External links
Official website

Slovak brands
Tire manufacturers of Slovakia
Continental AG
Manufacturing companies of Czechoslovakia